Ali Amiri Khodamorad (born March 21, 1988) is an Iranian footballer. He currently plays in the striker position for the Iran Pro League club, Rah Ahan.

Club career
Playing for Foolad FC in 2006–2007, Khodamorad made an appearance as a substitute in the Asian Champions League 2006 against Al-Ittihad of Syria, although he had not made any IPL appearance for the club before.

He joined Pas Hamedan in 2007 after playing only 5 games for this team Amiri joined Saba but another bad season for him, He decided to move a lower division and play for Damash Gilan in Azadegan League for 2009–2010 season.

Club career statistics 

Last update August 6, 2013

International career
Amiri used to be part of the Iran national under-20 football team and Iran national under-23 football team.

References
 Iran Pro League Stats

Iranian footballers
Association football midfielders
Foolad FC players
Damash Gilan players
PAS Hamedan F.C. players
Saba players
Rah Ahan players
1988 births
Living people